This is a list of diplomatic missions in Mongolia. The capital city Ulaanbaatar currently hosts 25 embassies. Many other countries have non-resident embassies either resident in Beijing, Seoul, or elsewhere.

Diplomatic missions in Ulaanbaatar

Embassies

Other missions or delegations 
 (Delegation)
 (Trade & Economic Representation Office)

Consular missions

Ulaanbataar 
 (Consular office)

Darkhan 
 (Consulate-General)

Erdenet 
 (Consulate-General)

Zamyn-Üüd 
 (Consulate-General)

Accredited embassies 
Resident in Beijing, China:

 
  
 
 
 
 
 
 
 
 
 
 
 
 
 
 
 
 
 
 
 
 
 
 
 
 
 
 
  
 
 
 
 
 
 
 
 
 
 
 
 
 
 
 
 
 
 
 
 
  
 
 
 
 
 
 
 
 
 
 
 
 
 
 
 
 
 
 
 
 
 
 
  
 
 
 
 
 
 
 
 

Resident in Seoul, South Korea:

 
 
 
 
 
 
 

Resident in Moscow, Russia:

 
 
 
 
 
 

Resident elsewhere:

  (New Delhi)
  (San Marino)
  (Astana)

Embassies to Open
 (Ulaanbaatar)

Former Embassy

See also 
 Foreign relations of Mongolia
 List of diplomatic missions of Mongolia
 Visa requirements for Mongolian citizens

References

External links 
 List of diplomatic missions of Mongolia
 Ministry of Foreign Affairs of Mongolia
 Diplomatic List Ulan Bator

Mongolia
Diplomatic missions